Phosphinous acids are usually organophosphorus compounds with the formula R2POH. They are pyramidal in structure.  Phosphorus is in the oxidation state III.  Most phosphinous acids rapidly convert to the corresponding phosphine oxide, which are tetrahedral and are assigned oxidation state V.

Synthesis
Only one example is known, bis(trifluoromethyl)phosphinous acid, (CF3)2POH.  It is prepared in several steps from phosphorus trichloride (Et = ethyl):
PCl3  +  2 Et2NH  →  PCl2NEt2  +  Et2NH2Cl
2 P(NEt2)3  +  PCl2NEt2  +  2 CF3Br  →  P(CF3)2NEt2  +  2 BrClP(NEt2)3
P(CF3)2NEt2  +  H2O  →   P(CF3)2OH  +  HNEt2

Reactions
With the lone exception of the bis(trifluoromethyl) derivative, the dominant reaction of phosphinous acids is tautomerization:
PR2OH  →  OPR2H
Even the pentafluorophenyl compound P(C6F5)2OH is unstable with respect to the phosphine oxide.

Although phosphinous acids are rare, their P-bonded coordination complexes are well established, e.g.  Mo(CO)5P(OH)3.

Secondary and primary phosphine oxides
Tertiary phosphine oxides, compounds with the formula R3PO cannot tautomerize.  The situation is different for the secondary and primary phosphine oxides, with the respective formulas R2(H)PO and R(H)2PO.

References

Functional groups
Organophosphorus compounds